NSIP may refer to:

 Non-specific interstitial pneumonia
 Nationally significant infrastructure project in the UK